Eochy's Cairn is a cairn and National Monument located in County Mayo, Ireland.

Location

History

Eochy's Cairn has never been excavated, but is believed to have been constructed in the Neolithic.

According to tradition, it was the burial site of Eochaid mac Eirc after the mythical Battle of Moytura.

References

National Monuments in County Mayo
Archaeological sites in County Mayo